

Introduction 
Marine Academy Detachment (not to be confused with Marine Academy Plymouth) is an Army Cadet Force Detachment (formerly Platoon) situated within the school grounds of Marine Academy Plymouth. The Detachment is part of Devon ACF, B Company (Plymouth ACF).

Administration 
Marine Academy Detachment is run by a team of volunteers known as Adult Instructors. The team is led by a Detachment Commander (formerly Platoon Commander) who in turn reports to the local Company Commander. Each Company consists of a number of Detachments, variance in strength depends on geography of area.

B Company Devon ACF 
B Company (Bravo Company) covers Plymouth and the surrounding area, it consists of 8 Detachments:
 Marine Academy Detachment
 All Saints Academy Detachment
 Mutley Detachment
 Crownhill Detachment
 Tavistock Detachment
 Ivybridge Detachment
 Plymstock Detachment
 Plympton Detachment

Devon ACF 
Devon ACF is broken down into 4 companies with its headquarters in Exeter. Devon ACF's regimental affiliation is to the Rifles, an Infantry Regiment in the British Army which counts the Devonshire and Dorset Regiment amongst its antecedent regiments. The Detachments of Devon ACF are as follows:
 A Company (Exeter and East Devon) - Wyvern (Exeter), West Exe (Exeter), Exmouth, Crediton, Honiton, Cullumpton, Tiverton, Sidmouth, Uffculme
 B Company (Plymouth) - Tavistock, Plymstock, Plympton, Mutley, Marine Academy Detachment, All Saints Academy Detachment, Ivybridge, Crownhill.
 C Company (North Devon) - South Molton, Okehampton, Holsworthy, Ilfracombe, Torrington, Braunton, Bideford, Barnstaple, Chulmleigh
 D Company (Torbay) - Bovey Tracey, Brixham, Newton Abbot, Paignton, Teignmouth, Tiverton, Torquay, Totnes

Syllabus 
The Army Cadet Force follows a national syllabus known as the Army Proficiency Certificate. The syllabus is broken into 9 categories with equal weighing:
 Fieldcraft
 Skill at Arms & Shooting
 Navigation (DofE)
 Physical Achievement
 Cadet in the Community
 First Aid (St. John's Ambulance)
 Signals
 Drill and Turnout
 Military Knowledge

Ranks
Ranks in the ACF follow the pattern of those in the British Army.

Cadet ranks
As well as learning new skills by working through the APC syllabus, experienced cadets can be awarded a rank. As the Army allows its soldiers to take on responsibility and leadership as Non-commissioned Officers or NCOs, so too does the ACF.

Cadet NCOs wear the issued cadet rank slides, pictured above. The titles of some ranks may vary as cadet detachments are affiliated to Army regiments and adopt their terminology. There is usually only one Cadet RSM per county.

Although promotion is based on merit rather than progression through the APC syllabus, the following criteria must be met before a cadet is eligible for promotion:
 Cadet Lance Corporal - Passed APC 1 Star
 Cadet Corporal - Passed APC 2 Star
 Cadet Sergeant - Passed APC 3 Star 
 Cadet Staff/Colour Sergeant - Passed APC 4 Star
 Cadet Sergeant Major/Company Sergeant Major - Passed APC 4 Star 
 Cadet Regimental Sergeant Major - Master Cadet

In some instances, cadets that do not meet the requirements for these ranks can be promoted with the agreement of the ACF Cadet Commandant.

CFAV ranks
The adults who are employed to help run the ACF are collectively known as Cadet Force Adult Volunteers(CFAVs). There are two different kinds of CFAVs, Non-commissioned Officers and Commissioned Officers. As in the Regular Army and Army Reserves, Commissioned Officers out-rank NCOs. The role of the CFAV NCO is to instruct Cadets, the role of the CFAV Officer is to instruct Cadets and command CFAV NCOs.

NCOs 
NCO CFAVs wear the badges of rank as worn by Army NCOs with the addition of the letters ACF under the badge.

Officers 
Commissioned officers within the ACF wear the same rank slides as British Army officers; however, the letters ACF appear under the insignia. The colours and style of the rank slides mirror the affiliated regiment's.

Links 

Army cadet organisations